The Cooper Glacier is a tributary glacier,  long, flowing northeast between Butchers Spur and the Quarles Range to enter the south side of Axel Heiberg Glacier, in the Queen Maud Mountains. It was discovered by R. Admiral Byrd on several plane flights to the Queen Maud Mountains in November 1929, and named by him for Kent Cooper, an official of the Associated Press.

References 

Glaciers of Amundsen Coast